Triumph Tiger 900 may refer to two different motorcycles:

 a model manufactured 1993−1998, see Triumph Tiger 900 (T400),
 a model manufactured from 2020 onwards, see Triumph Tiger 900 (2020).